Qaleh-ye Mansur (also Romanized as Qal‘eh-ye Manşūr and Qal‘eh Manşūr) is a village in Beyranvand-e Jonubi Rural District, Bayravand District, Khorramabad County, Lorestan Province, Iran. At the 2006 census, its population was 52, in 14 families.

References 

Towns and villages in Khorramabad County